The Greatest Mixes is a remix compilation album by Grandmaster Flash and the Furious Five released in 1998 in the UK by Deepbeat Records/Castle Music.

Overview
The Greatest Mixes contains rare unreleased tracks and remixes from both Grandmaster Flash and the Furious Five and Melle Mel. The LP's foldout sleeve also contains a summarised biography of Grandmaster Flash and the Furious Five by Lewis Dene of Blues & Soul. The Greatest Mixes was later reissued in 2002.

Track listing

References

Grandmaster Flash and the Furious Five albums
1997 remix albums
Sanctuary Records remix albums